Vega is a municipality in Nordland county, Norway. It is part of the Helgeland traditional region. The administrative centre of the municipality is the village of Gladstad. Other villages include Holand and Ylvingen.

The municipality comprises about 6,500 islands in the Vega Archipelago. Bremstein Lighthouse is located in the southwestern part of the municipality.

The  municipality is the 314th largest by area out of the 356 municipalities in Norway. Vega is the 320th most populous municipality in Norway with a population of 1,175.

General information

The municipality of Vega was established on 1 January 1838 (see formannskapsdistrikt law). On 1 January 1965, the Skogsholmen area (population: 196) was transferred from Tjøtta Municipality to Vega Municipality. Then on 1 January 1971, the Skålvær islands (population: 32) in the northeastern part of Vega was transferred to Alstahaug Municipality.

Name
The municipality (originally the parish) is named after the main island of Vega since the first Vega Church was built there. The name was written "Vegø" prior to 1891.

Coat of arms
The coat of arms was granted on 20 November 1987. The official blazon is "Gules, a scoop Or". This means the arms have a red field (background) and the charge is a bailer for a boat. The bailer or scoop has a tincture of Or which means it is commonly colored yellow, but if it is made out of metal, then gold is used. A bailer is an essential tool that is important to the municipality due to its dependence on the sea. The arms were designed by Tore Engen. An earlier plan for the Vega coat of arms pictured the black silhouette of a sailing boat on a yellow background, but this design was chosen as the coat of arms for Nordland county.

Churches
The Church of Norway has one parish within the municipality of Vega. It is part of the Sør-Helgeland prosti (deanery) in the Diocese of Sør-Hålogaland.

History
Early settlements on the main island date back 10,000 years, making it one of the oldest places of inhabitance in Northern Norway. Agriculture and fishing are at present as they were in the past, key fields of labour. Today's inhabitants are concentrated in Holand, Valla, Igerøy, Ylvingen, and Gladstad, the latter being the location of the municipal council and most of the island's commerce.

Geography
In 2004, the archipelago's cultural landscape was inscribed by UNESCO on the World Heritage Site list as representative of "the way generations of fishermen/farmers have, over the past 1,500 years, maintained a sustainable living in an inhospitable seascape near the Arctic Circle, based on the now unique practice of eider down harvesting." The oceanic climate and limestone bedrock has allowed 10 different species of orchids to grow in Vega, and 210 species of birds have been recorded at the archipelago.

Eidemsliene nature reserve has many warmth-loving species of plants and the most oceanic pine forest in North Norway.  Holandsosen nature reserve is an important wetland area with a shallow lake and soil rich in lime; 149 species of birds have been observed in this reserve which has a rich bird life all year (many birds use this as their winter quarter). Lånan nature reserve preserves many types of coastal nature and is a very important area for many species of birds; eider down harvesting is still practiced here.

Climate
Vega has a temperate oceanic climate, also known as marine west coast climate (Köppen climate classification: Cfb). The average date for the last overnight freeze (low below ) in spring is 29 April and average date for first freeze in autumn is 17 October giving a frost-free season of 170 days (1981-2010 average).

Government
All municipalities in Norway, including Vega, are responsible for primary education (through 10th grade), outpatient health services, senior citizen services, unemployment and other social services, zoning, economic development, and municipal roads. The municipality is governed by a municipal council of elected representatives, which in turn elect a mayor.  The municipality falls under the Brønnøy District Court and the Hålogaland Court of Appeal.

Municipal council
The municipal council of Vega is made up of 15 representatives that are elected to four year terms. The party breakdown of the council is as follows:

Mayors
The mayors of Vega (incomplete list):

 1883-1886: Nicolai Hansen Kjælkdalen
 1887-1904: Andreas Andersen Grimsø (V)
 1905-1928: Peter Nicolaisen (V)
 1929-1931: Oskar Floa (Ap)
 1932-1937: Emil Wahl (V)
 1938-1941: Oskar Floa (Ap)
 1943-1945: J. Robertsen (NS)
 1945-1948: Oskar Floa (Ap)
 1948-1967: Haakon O. Wika (Ap)
 1968-1974: Olav D. Gullsvåg (Ap)
 1975-1979: Osvald Floa (Ap)
 1980-1981: Egil Mortensen (Sp)
 1982-1983: Gunnar Sundsvold (Sp)
 1984-1995: Osvald Floa (Ap)
 1995-2007: Einar Silseth (Sp)
 2007-present: Andre Møller (Ap)

Notable people 
 Haakon Olsen Wika (1899 in Vega – 1981) a Norwegian politician, Mayor of Vega 1947 to 1966

Media gallery

References

External links

Municipal fact sheet from Statistics Norway 
Vega Havhotell 
Images of Vega Island and the surrounding region by Dana Morris

 
Municipalities of Nordland
World Heritage Sites in Norway
1838 establishments in Norway